Lowell Selvin (born April 15, 1959) is the former chairman and CEO of PlanetOut Inc.  He oversaw the merger of PlanetOut Corp. and Online Partners, and acquisitions of LPI Media and RSVP (a travel company).

Biography
Selvin graduated from the University of Illinois with bachelor's degrees in psychology and aeronautical and astronautical engineering. He later worked for Arbonne International and Arthur Andersen.

He is also currently involved with the Gay & Lesbian Network of the Young Presidents' Organization and the Institute for Judaism and Sexual Orientation at Hebrew Union College.

In June 2006, Selvin was succeeded as CEO of PlanetOut by board member Karen Magee in June 2006.

Sources

Notes

Grainger College of Engineering alumni
Living people
1959 births
American chief executives in the media industry
American LGBT businesspeople
20th-century American businesspeople